Witold Stefan Bendkowski (born 2 September 1961) is a Polish football player. He has played in Polish football clubs such as Unia Skierniewice and especially ŁKS Łódź, as well as the South Korean club Yukong Elephants.

References

External links
 

1961 births
Living people
People from Rawa Mazowiecka
Polish footballers
Polish expatriate footballers
ŁKS Łódź players
Jeju United FC players
K League 1 players
Ekstraklasa players
Expatriate footballers in South Korea
Sportspeople from Łódź Voivodeship
Association football midfielders
Association football defenders
Poland international footballers